Bittereinder was a supporter of the Boer cause who wished to continue the fight during the commando phase of the Second Boer War (1899-1902) and after the formal ending of hostilities. It may also refer to
 Bittereinder (band) is a South African Hip-Hop band